Süt Kardeşler is a 1976 Turkish comedy film directed by Ertem Eğilmez.

Cast 
 Kemal Sunal – Şaban
 Şener Şen – Hüsamettin
 Halit Akçatepe – Ramazan
 Hale Soygazi – Bihter
 Adile Naşit – Melek
 Ayşen Gruda – Emine
 Ali Şen – Kerami
 Yasemin Esmergül – Yasemin

External links 

1976 films
1970s historical comedy films
Films set in the Ottoman Empire
Films set in Istanbul
Turkish historical comedy films
Turkish comedy horror films
Films shot in Istanbul
1970s comedy horror films
1976 comedy films